Centre Island is a small island in Salvador Water, East Falkland, Falkland Islands.

It is a breeding place for seals, including elephant seals, and sea lions.

Islands of the Falkland Islands